Dejan Denkovski was a member of the Armed Forces in Macedonia. He was killed in action near the village of Aleshevce in 2001.

See also
 2001 insurgency in the Republic of Macedonia

References

People from Kumanovo
2001 deaths